William Earl Gillespie (born October 24, 1961) is a former American football running back in the National Football League. He played for the Tampa Bay Bandits in the USFL, where he had the distinction of catching the winning touchdown in the Bandits first-ever USFL game. He later played in the NFL, for both the Tampa Bay Buccaneers and the Minnesota Vikings. He went to junior college at East Mississippi Community College, and later attended the University of Tennessee-Chattanooga. He is the current wide-receivers coach at Starkville High School, his alma mater in 1979.

References

1961 births
Living people
Sportspeople from Starkville, Mississippi
Players of American football from Mississippi
American football running backs
Starkville High School alumni